Marloes Road is a street in Kensington, London, that runs roughly south to north from a T-junction with Cromwell Road, to Cheniston Gardens and Abingdon Villas. It has junctions with (inter alia) Lexham Gardens, Stratford Road, and Scarsdale Villas.

The southern part was originally called Barrow's Walk, and Marloes Road itself has a "somewhat confusing history".

St Mary Abbots Hospital was built there in 1871, and operated as a hospital until its demolition in 1992, when it was replaced with blocks of flats.

No. 39 is home to the Embassy of Senegal, London.

In 1939, the soldier, literary agent, and publisher Neville Armstrong and his wife were living at no 17.

References

Streets in the Royal Borough of Kensington and Chelsea